Hyde-Smith is a surname. Notable people with the surname include:

Christopher Hyde-Smith (born 1935), British flautist
Cindy Hyde-Smith (born 1959), American politician

Compound surnames